Serpmekaya is a village in the Karlıova District, Bingöl Province, Turkey. The village is populated by Kurds of the Cibran tribe and had a population of 612 in 2021.

The hamlets of Harmanlı and Yalnızlar are attached to the village.

References 

Villages in Karlıova District
Kurdish settlements in Bingöl Province